The Water of Leith (Scottish Gaelic: Uisge Lìte) is the main river flowing near central Edinburgh, Scotland, and flows into the port of Leith where it flows into the sea via the Firth of Forth.

Name
The name Leith may be of Brittonic origin and derived from *lejth meaning 'damp, moist' (Welsh llaith). It is less likely that the name derives from the Old Norse lodda meaning a river. The Gaelic form of the name is Lìte (Leith), with Uisge Lìte being the full translation of "Water of Leith".

The Dictionary of the Scots Language defines the term "water" here as "A large stream, usu. thought of as intermediate in size between a Burn and a river."

Course

It travels through Harperrig Reservoir, past the ruins of Cairns Castle, through Balerno, Currie, Juniper Green, Colinton, Slateford, Longstone, Saughton, Balgreen, Roseburn, West Coates and on to the nearest it gets to the Edinburgh city centre at the Dean Village, on the site of old watermills in a deep gorge. This ravine is dramatically spanned by the Dean Bridge, designed by Thomas Telford, which was built in 1832 for the road to Queensferry, and lies next to the New Town.

The river flows on past Stockbridge, Inverleith, Canonmills and Warriston where it passes through shallows at a place known as Puddocky which is commonly thought to refer to "puddocks", the Scots language term for frogs, but actually took its name from the former Paddock Hall which was sited nearby. The river continues past Bonnington, the site of another watermill,  to Leith where it widens into the old harbour and port at the Shore. Leith Docks have been extended considerably out into the firth from the old shoreline, and there are now plans to discontinue their use as a port and use the area for housing redevelopment.

The route forms an attractive haven for wildlife, passing through areas of woodland, often well separated from roads. For some distance the walkway follows the route of former railway tracks, and the remains of tunnels, bridges and other features of more than one railway may be seen at many places along the route.

A visitor centre is open to the public where the Union Canal passes over the Water of Leith via the Slateford Aqueduct at Slateford, in south-west Edinburgh. The Water of Leith Conservation Trust is dedicated to the conservation and enhancement of the river. The Trust provides education programs about the river and the environment.

Wildlife

The river is stocked with brown trout, and also contains wild grayling, eels, stone loach, minnow, three-spined stickleback and flounder. A few sea-trout run the river, and occasional Atlantic salmon are reported, although those from which scale samples have been obtained have turned out to be from other catchments. Until the weirs are either demolished or furnished with effective fish-passes, there is little chance of a population of salmon establishing themselves in this river again. Roe deer, badgers, otters and other mammals are occasionally seen. The river and its environs are the haunt of a wide variety of woodland and water birds, including kingfisher, grey heron, pied wagtail, great spotted woodpecker and white-throated dipper.

See also
Rivers of Scotland
River Almond, which flows through Cramond and Kirkliston
River Esk, Lothian
Water of Leith, a river which flows through Dunedin, New Zealand

References

External links

Water of Leith Conservation Trust: The River, Visitor Center, Education, Conservation
 Scottish Government, 16/03/07: Water of Leith Flood Prevention Scheme
Water of Leith
Water of Leith Millennium Bid document. The bid was successful and paid for new sections of the Walkway and the Visitor Centre.
 "Forth District Salmon Fishery Board"
 "River Forth Fisheries Trust"

 
Leith
Lothian
Leith
Nature centres in Scotland
Tourist attractions in Edinburgh
0WaterofLeith